Measuring instruments
Yeasts